Christopher Alan Schmitz is an American composer and winner of the 2007 Sammy Nestico Award in Jazz Composition.  He is currently a professor of music theory at Mercer University, having previously taught at Southwestern College in Kansas.

Compositions

Selected Ensemble Works 
 Suite for MLK (jazz ensemble, in progress)
 Hugh Smalling (opera + full orchestra, in progress)
 Lilac Dream (flute choir)
 "Gloria" (SSA voices + chamber winds)
 "Gloria" (SSA voices + piano w/ brass solo)
 "Georgia On My Mind" (SATB a cappella)
 "Georgia On My Mind" (SSA + jazz rhythm section)
 Berkshire Fantasy (wind ensemble)
 Sussurus (jazz ensemble)
 Walnut Valley March for the Winfield Municipal Band
 Symphony for Winds and Percussion
 Frozen Sun (symphonic poem for full orchestra)
 After Dark for concert choir (SATB)
 Pine Grove for jazz ensemble
 Transformation for jazz ensemble (revision)
 Equilibrium for jazz ensemble
 "Akerage" for solo tenor saxophone with jazz ensemble

Selected Chamber Works 
 Set of Patriotic Duets (violin and cello)
 Gentle Light (piano trio)
 Rhapsody (violin and piano)
 Five Miniatures (alto saxophone and mallet percussion)
 Strange Birds (chamber suite for flute, piano and marimba)
 Through primrose tufts... (string quartet)
 Out in Front (jazz sextet)
 Austin-tatious (jazz sextet)
 Three Lyric Songs (soprano, viola, and harp—texts by Sassoon)
 Rhapsody (two violas and piano)
 Palindrome for Anna (mixed chamber winds)
 Nyxian Progeny (string quartet)
 Trio for Horn, Violin, and Piano

Selected Solo Works 
 All-State Sight Reading Etudes, Complete Set (Alabama Orch.)
 Concertino (trumpet and piano)
 Escape! (solo trumpet + live electronic processing)
 Arctic Vision (solo clarinet and electro-acoustic soundscape)
 Organ Toccata for Dr. James Leland
 Arctic Circle (solo flute and electro-acoustic soundscape)
 Sonata No. 1 (three movements, solo piano)

Commercial Recordings and Publications 
 ACE Composers: Ravello Records
 Irrational Exuberance: Beauport Classical 
 Awaiting the Sun: Beauport Classical 
 Transformation: Sea Breeze
 Opus Music Publishers: Northfield, IL (sheet music) 
 Cimarron Music Publishers: Salem, CT (sheet music)
 Walrus Music Publishers: Pismo Beach, CA (sheet music)

References

External links 
 The Olney Big Band Newsletter
 Ace Composers Review
 Oberlin Conservatory Alumni Notes
 

1972 births
Living people
21st-century American composers